Capusa is a genus of moths in the family Geometridae.

There are six species.

Species
 Capusa chionopleura Turner, 1926
 Capusa cuculloides (R. Felder, 1874)
 Capusa graodes Turner, 1919
 Capusa leptoneura (Turner, 1926)
 Capusa senilis Walker, 1857
 Capusa stenophara Turner, 1919

References

External links
 Capusa at Markku Savela's Lepidoptera and Some Other Life Forms

Nacophorini